Mork may refer to:

Character on the American sitcoms Happy Days and Mork & Mindy (1978–82)
Mork (file format), a computer file format previously used by Mozilla-based web browsers
A village near St Briavels in Gloucestershire, England
 Mork, Hama, a village in Syria
 Slang term for aliens in the British science fiction television series The Aliens (TV series) (2016)
Affectionate nickname for K-pop singer Mark Lee
Affectionate nickname for K-pop singer Mark Tuan

People
Adrien Mörk (born 1979), French professional golfer
Hans Mork, Australian rugby league footballer
Ingolf Mork (1947–2012), Norwegian ski jumper

See also
Mørk, Norwegian or Danish surname